Fois may refer to:
 Foix, France
 Giovanni Melis Fois (1916–2009), Italian Roman Catholic prelate
 Marcello Fois (born 1960), Italian writer
 Valentino Fois (1973–2008), Italian cyclist

See also 
 FOI (disambiguation)